Coruscant Nights is a trilogy of novels by Michael Reaves. The series is set in the Star Wars universe a year after Star Wars: Episode III – Revenge of the Sith. Rather than follow closely after each these, the books follow the same group of characters. Characters from the Medstar Duology reappear here.

A stand-alone follow-up novel to the trilogy, The Last Jedi, was released in 2013, which was also written by Reaves, along with Maya Kaathryn Bohnhoff.

External links
 Star Wars official Cargo Bay site
 

Book series introduced in 2008
Star Wars Legends novels
2008 novels
Del Rey books